El Presidio Real de San Diego (Royal Presidio of San Diego) is a historic fort in San Diego, California. It was established on May 14, 1769, by Gaspar de Portolá, leader of the first European land exploration of Alta California—at that time an unexplored northwestern frontier area of New Spain. The presidio was the first permanent European settlement on the Pacific Coast of the present-day United States.  As the first of the presidios and Spanish missions in California, it was the base of operations for the Spanish colonization of California. The associated Mission San Diego de Alcalá later moved a few miles away.

Essentially abandoned by 1835, the site of the original Presidio lies on a hill within present-day Presidio Park, although no historic structures remain above ground. The San Diego Presidio was registered as a California Historical Landmark in 1932, then declared a National Historic Landmark in 1960.

History
Prior to occupation by the Spanish, the site of the Presidio was home to the Kumeyaay people (called the Diegueños by the Spaniards).

The first Europeans to explore San Diego Bay and its environs were members of the maritime expedition led by Juan Rodríguez Cabrillo in 1542. Sebastián Vizcaíno visited again in 1602, but no settlement was made until the fort was begun in May 1769. On July 16, 1769, Mission San Diego de Alcalá was established by Junípero Serra on Presidio Hill. The presidio had a commanding view of San Diego Bay and the Pacific Ocean, allowing the Spanish to see potential intruders.

Less than a month after the mission was established, a Kumeyaay uprising occurred; four Spaniards were wounded and a boy was killed. After the attack, the Spaniards built a stockade which was finished in March 1770. It included two bronze cannons: one pointed to the bay, the other to the nearby Indian village. One of the cannons, El Jupiter, is now in the Serra Museum.

In 1773 and 1774, adobe structures were built to replace the temporary wood and brush huts. Later in 1774, the mission was moved a few miles up Mission Valley to separate the Kumeyaay from the influence of the presidial garrison. By 1783, there were 54 troops stationed at the presidio.

With Mexican independence in 1821, the presidio came under Mexican control, and was officially relinquished by the Spanish on April 20, 1822. From 1825–1829, it served as the Mexican governor's residence. The presidio was abandoned by 1835 and fell to ruins, because settlers preferred to live in the more accessible town—present-day Old Town San Diego State Historic Park—which developed at the foot of Presidio Hill.

Preservation

In 1907 George Marston, a wealthy department store owner, bought Presidio Hill with an interest to preserve the site. Unable to attract public funding, Marston built a private park in 1925 with the help of architect John Nolen. He also funded the Junípero Serra Museum, designed by William Templeton Johnson and built in 1928–1929 in Spanish Revival style architecture, to house and showcase the collection of the San Diego Historical Society (now the San Diego History Center). Serra Museum is sometimes incorrectly referred to as the Presidio, but in fact nothing remains of the original Presidio. Marston donated the park and museum to the city in 1929. Presidio Park is still owned by the city of San Diego; the Serra Museum is managed by the San Diego History Center.

No historical structures remain in Presidio Park today. The Presidio site is occasionally used for archaeological excavations.

There are additional photographs available.

See also

 Commandants of the Presidio of San Diego
 Military Districts in Spanish California

References

Further reading
 "Early History of the San Diego Presidial District, 1542-1782." UC Berkeley thesis, 1930, by Lucien C. Atherton.

External links

 "Use of Presidio Hill", Journal of San Diego History 45:3 (Summer 1999) by Jennifer Luksic and Nik Kendziorski
 El Presidio Real de San Diego
 "Life on Presidio Hill Under the Spanish Flag", History of San Diego (1907-08) by William E. Smythe
 Presidio Park - City of San Diego website
 Serra Museum - San Diego History Center website
 Early History of the California Coast, a National Park Service Discover Our Shared Heritage Travel Itinerary

San Diego
1769 in Alta California
Parks in San Diego
History of San Diego
History of San Diego County, California
Forts on the National Register of Historic Places in California
National Register of Historic Places in San Diego
National Historic Landmarks in California
1769 establishments in Alta California
Spanish Colonial architecture in California